The Cave (known in Thai as Nang Non) is a 2019 Thai action-drama film about the 2018 Tham Luang cave rescue in Chiang Rai Province, Thailand, written and directed by Tom Waller and co-produced by Waller and Allen Liu. The story is written from the points of view of several individuals involved in the rescue operation, and features cave diver Jim Warny and others as themselves. The film premiered at the 2019 Busan International Film Festival, and was released in Thailand on 21 November. It had a re-edited release in 2022 as Cave Rescue.

Summary
The film covers events of the 2018 cave rescue, focusing in turn on several individuals who contributed to the rescue effort, including water pump manufacturer Nopadol Niyomka, retired Thai Navy SEAL Saman Kunan, and especially, Ireland-based cave diver Jim Warny.

Cast
Jim Warny as himself, a Belgian diver and electrician based in Ireland
Ekawat Niratworapanya as Ekkaphon Chanthawong, stateless assistant coach of the "Wild Boar" soccer team
Tan Xiaolong as himself, a Chinese diver
James Edward Holley as a U.S. Air Force Major
Lawrence de Stefano as Chris, British lead diver
Nirut Sirijanya as Minister of Tourism
Bobby Gerrits as a U.S. Air Force Staff Sergeant
Ross Cain as John, a British diver
Thaweesak Thananan as Saman Gunan, a retired Thai Navy SEAL and diver
Jumpa Saenprom as Mae Bua Chaicheun, a Thai rice farmer
Todd Ruiz as himself, an American reporter for Khaosod English
Erik Brown as himself, a Canadian diver
Mikko Paasi as himself, a Finnish diver
Ross W. Clarkson as an Australian doctor
Michael Shaowanasai as a Thai officer
Terdporn Manopaiboon as Phra Khuva Boonchum, a Thai Buddhist monk
Treechada Petcharat as a Thai reporter
Maggi Apa as an ambulance nurse
Payao Nimma as Prayut Chan-o-cha, Prime Minister of Thailand

Production
The film was produced by Waller's Bangkok-based De Warrenne Pictures. Waller began working on the film soon after the actual events of June–July 2018, and decided on the story after meeting Warny in Ireland. He co-wrote the script with Don Linder and Katrina Grose, focusing on "the unsung heroes—how they first heard what was happening, how they reacted and dropped everything to help." Several individuals involved in the effort portrayed themselves in the film. Most of the filming took place from October 2018 to January 2019, but it was not until February that Waller was allowed to film at the Tham Luang Nang Non cave. The majority of cave scenes were filmed in other caves in Thailand as well as on a set built over a swimming pool. The film was the first about the rescue to be released, while exclusive rights over the boys' stories had been sold to Netflix.

Release and reception
The film premiered at the Busan International Film Festival on 5 October 2019, and was shown at the Vancouver International the BFI London film festivals before its release in Thailand on 21 November. It made 1.1 million baht (US$36,000) on its opening day, and was the second-largest opening that week, following Frozen 2, which earned $9.92 million.

Critical reception to the film was mostly muted. Writing for The Hollywood Reporter, Elizabeth Kerr described the film as "a technically proficient but unemotional rescue drama." Wendy Ide wrote in Screen International, "Like the cave rescue itself, the film isn't the disaster it easily could have been. But it's far from achieving an equivalent triumph." According to the Bangkok Post Kong Rithdee, the story "feels thin and depthless at times," but ultimately, the film "justifies its existence quite sufficiently."

In Thailand, a minor plot point, where pump manufacturer Nopadol's efforts were initially hampered by bureaucratic requirements, generated heated online discussion. Also, Governor Narongsak Osottanakorn, who led the rescue operation, criticized Waller for not representing the entire operation, as well as for making "jokes that attack the works of Thai civil servants". Waller countered that the Governor should not have criticized without first seeing the film.

A re-edited version of the film, under the title Cave Rescue, received a limited theatrical and digital release by Lionsgate on 5 August 2022.

See also 
 The Rescue (2021 film), 2021 documentary film about these events.
 Thirteen Lives, a 2022 Hollywood feature film about the event.

References

External links

2019 films
Thai drama films
Films set in 2018
Films shot in Chiang Rai province
Films shot in Ireland
Films shot in the United Kingdom
Tham Luang cave rescue